St. Austin's Military School is a defunct American military academy formerly located in the West Brighton section of Staten Island, New York.

The school was founded in 1883 by the Rev. Alfred G. Mortimer with the name St. Austin's Episcopal School for Boys.  The name of the school was soon changed to St. Austin's Military School.  In 1898, it moved to Connecticut.

While on Staten Island the school was housed in the former Garner Mansion near the corner of Castleton and Bard Avenues. The building still exists as part of the campus of Richmond University Medical Center. A nearby street named St. Austin's Place is a reminder of the school.

See also

 List of defunct military academies in the United States

References

 Staten Island Advance, February 21, 2008, page C-2.
 Staten Island Historical Society library.

Organizations with year of disestablishment missing
1883 establishments in New York (state)
Defunct schools in Connecticut
Defunct schools in New York City
Defunct United States military academies
Educational institutions established in 1883
Private schools in Connecticut
Private schools in Staten Island
West New Brighton, Staten Island